Moby-Dick is a stage musical in four parts with lyrics, music and book by Dave Malloy. An adaptation of the classic 1851 novel by Herman Melville, the musical made its world premiere in December 2019 at the American Repertory Theater in Cambridge, Massachusetts, directed by Rachel Chavkin.

Production history 
Part III: "The Ballad of Pip" was performed as a standalone jazz song-cycle at Joe's Pub on March 20, 2014.

On July 26, 2019, and July 27, 2019, a 90-minute concert of excerpts from Moby-Dick was performed at the American Museum of Natural History, in the Milstein Hall of Ocean Life underneath the whale.

The musical had its world premiere at the American Repertory Theater in Cambridge, Massachusetts on December 11, 2019, after one week of previews.

Musical numbers 

Prologue
 The Sermon – Mapple
 Etymology – Ishmael

Part I "The Doubloon"
 "Loomings" – Ishmael, Company
 "Knights & Squires" – Ishmael, Company
i. Knights & Squires (I)
ii. Knights & Squires (II)
iii. Isolatoes
 "A Bosom Friend" – Ishmael, Queequeg, Company
 "Ahab" – Company
 "The Quarter-Deck" – Ahab, Starbuck, Company
 {Whalesong Interlude (I)}/The Albatross – Daggoo, Pip
 Sunset – Ahab, Company

Part II "The Honour and Glory of Whaling"
 Cetology – Ishmael, Company
 Stubb Kills a Whale – Company
 Fedallah – Fedallah
 The Whale as a Dish/Cutting In – Stubb, Company
 A Squeeze of the Hand – Company
 The Pequod Meets the Bachelor – Boomer, Sailors
 The Try-Works – Ishmael, Fedallah, Company
 {Whalesong Interlude (II)} – Tashtego
 The Cabin – Ahab, Starbuck
 Dusk - Starbuck, Company

Part III "The Ballad of Pip; or, The Castaway"
 Pip – Ishmael
 Tambourine – Elijah, Company
 Shanty – Shanty Singer, Company
 Ocean – Mapple, Company
 Coda – Ahab, Pip

Part IV "The American Hearse"
 The Pacific – Queequeg, Ishmael
 Sextet – Company
 The Pequod Meets the Rachel – Gardiner, Company
 The Symphony – Company
 The Chase – Company
i. First Day
ii. Second Day
iii. Third Day
 Roll On {Whalesong Interlude (III)} – Tashtego, Daggoo, Company

Epilogue

Cast

Reception 

The Cambridge production was generally well reviewed, with praise for the music and the work of scenic designer Mimi Lien in particular, while common criticisms included the -hour length and "The Ballad of Pip" section. Don Aucoin of the Boston Globe wrote that it was "ambitiously conceived and superbly executed ... if occasionally self-indulgent," while Carolyn Clay of WBUR's ARTery called it "an extraordinary sum of diverse parts." On the other hand, Christopher Caggiano of The Arts Fuse criticized the production for trying to adapt the entire book, and for "forcing" contemporary parallels.

References 

Works based on Moby-Dick
2019 musicals
Musicals based on novels
Musicals by Dave Malloy